|}

The Hamburger Stutenmeile is a Group 3 flat horse race in Germany open to thoroughbred fillies and mares aged three years or older. It is run at Hamburg-Horn over a distance of 1,600 metres (about 1 mile), and it is scheduled to take place each year in June or July.

History
The event has been known by several different titles, and some of these have been assigned to various other races. It was called the Schwarzgold-Rennen from 1995 to 1998, and during this period it was ungraded. It was renamed the Schlenderhaner Stutenpreis in 1999, and given Listed status in 2000.

The race was retitled the Fährhofer Stutenpreis in 2001, and promoted to Group 3 level in 2004. It was subsequently registered as the Hamburger Stutenpreis, and later the Hamburger Stutenmeile.

Alternative titles have included the Alice-Cup (2006), the Credit Suisse-Rennen (2007), the Preis der Spielbank Hamburg (2008–09) and the Wenatex Europa-Grupperennen (2010). It was run at Bremen as the Walther J. Jacobs-Stutenmeile in 2011.

The Hamburger Stutenmeile is currently run in memory of Franz-Günther von Gaertner, a former president of the Hamburger Renn-Club.

Records
Most successful horse:
 no horse has won this race more than once since 1995

Leading jockey since 1995 (4 wins):
 Andreas Suborics – Voodoo Lounge (1998), Kimbajar (2001), Molly Art (2006), Touch My Soul (2007)

Leading trainer since 1995 (4 wins):
 Andreas Wöhler – Socota (1995), Kimbajar (2001), Peaceful Love (2005), Peace Royale (2008)

Winners since 1995

 The 2011 running took place at Bremen.

See also
 List of German flat horse races

References
 Racing Post / siegerlisten.com:
 , 2001, 
 horseracingintfed.com – International Federation of Horseracing Authorities – Hamburger Stutenmeile (2012).
 pedigreequery.com – Hamburger Stutenpreis – Hamburg.
 siegerlisten.com – Hamburger Stutenpreis.

Mile category horse races for fillies and mares
Horse races in Germany
Sports competitions in Hamburg